CFU-Eo is a colony forming unit that gives rise to eosinophils. Some sources prefer the term "CFU-Eos". It is also known as "hEoP".

References

Colony forming units
Blood cells